National Investments Company Limited (NICOL) Tanzania is a Tanzanian investments company headquartered in Dar es Salaam. It was incorporated in June 2003 as National Investments Company (NICO). In 2007 the company re-named itself as the National Investments Company Limited (NICOL). The company was one of the first few companies to be listed on the Dar es Salaam Stock Exchange in 2004. The majority of the company's investment portfolio is in securities, however, it also owns two active subsidiaries.

History

Public listing 
The company listed on the Dar es Salaam Stock Exchange all of its 1.6 billion shares at TSh  per share, on 15 July 2008. In 2011 the Capital markets authority forced them to de-list as they had not provided financials for 2009, 2010 and engaged in a sale of assets that was not in accordance to the law.

Corporate affairs

Business trends 
The key trends for NICOL over recent years are shown below (as at year ending 31 December):

Subsidiaries
 Tanzania Meat Company Limited - The company was founded on 28 July 2008 through a partnership between NICOL and the government's National Ranching Company (NARCO), with NICOL owning 51% of the shares. The company operates an abattoir in Dodoma.

References 

Companies of Tanzania